Ural is a Russian Project 22220 nuclear-powered icebreaker. Built by Baltic Shipyard in Saint Petersburg, the vessel was laid down in 2016, launched in 2019 and delivered in 2022.

Development and construction

Background 

In the late 1980s, the Russian research institutes and design bureaus developed a successor for the 1970s Arktika-class nuclear-powered icebreakers as part of a wider icebreaker fleet renewal program initiated shortly after the dissolution of the Soviet Union. The new 60-megawatt icebreaker, referred to using a type size series designation LK-60Ya, would feature a so-called dual-draft functionality which would allow the vessel to operate in shallow coastal areas after de-ballasting. Although the preliminary designs had been developed almost two decades earlier, the LK-60Ya design was finalized in 2009 as Project 22220 by Central Design Bureau "Iceberg" and the construction of the first vessel was awarded to Saint Petersburg-based Baltic Shipyard in August 2012. Two additional contracts in May 2014 and August 2019 have increased the number of Project 22220 icebreakers under construction or on order to five. , Russian government reportedly plans to allocate 118 billion rubles for the construction of two additional Project 22220 icebreakers that would be delivered in 2028 and 2029.

Construction 

The tender for construction of two additional Project 22220 nuclear-powered icebreakers, referred to as the first and second serial vessels of the project, was announced at the keel laying ceremony of the lead ship Arktika on 5 November 2013. On 8 May 2014, the 84.4 billion ruble (about US$2.4 billion) contract for two vessels was awarded to the Saint Petersburg-based Baltic Shipyard which was the only company whose bid had been accepted.

The keel of the third Project 22220 icebreaker was laid on 25 July 2016, shortly after the partially-assembled hull of the previous vessel, Sibir, had been moved down the slipway for final hull assembly. Unlike in the previous two vessels, the RITM-200 nuclear reactors were lifted onboard the vessel while it was still on the slipway. The name had previously been selected for the final Arktika-class icebreaker when it was laid down in 1989, but during construction the vessel was renamed 50 Let Pobedy.

Initially, the delivery of the third Project 22220 nuclear-powered icebreaker was scheduled for 2020, but this has since been postponed to 2022 due to problems with the delivery of the steam turbines from a domestic manufacturer.

On 26 May 2020, Urals level of technical readiness was reported to be 50 %.

In February 2021, there was a minor fire onboard the icebreaker.

Ural left for the sea trials on 14 October 2022 and returned to the shipyard on 31 October, having reportedly finished factory sea trials in record time.

The flag-raising ceremony marking Urals entry to service was held on 22 November 2022. The icebreaker left for its homeport, Murmansk, on the following day and arrived there on 30 November. On 2 December, the icebreaker departed for its first operational icebreaking mission to the Kara Sea.

Design 

Ural has a nuclear-turbo-electric powertrain. The onboard nuclear power plant consists of two 175 RITM-200 pressurized water reactors fueled by up to 20% enriched Uranium-235 and two 36 turbogenerators. The propulsion system follows the classic polar icebreaker pattern with three  four-bladed propellers driven by  electric motors.

Notes

References 

Project 22220 icebreakers
2019 ships